Voucher privatization is a privatization method where citizens are given or can inexpensively buy a book of vouchers that represent potential shares in any state-owned company. Voucher privatization has mainly been used in the early to mid-1990s in the transition economies of Central and Eastern Europe — countries such as Russia, Bulgaria, Slovenia, Czechoslovakia and Hungary.

See also
History of post-Soviet Russia
Viktor Kožený
Privatization in Russia

External links
 David Ellerman, "Lessons From East Europe’s Voucher Privatization",  The Capital Ownership Group (virtual think tank).

Payment systems
Economic history of the Soviet Union
Privatization